Gavriel Salomon (October 1938 – January 2016) was an Israeli educational psychologist who conducted research on cognition and instruction. He was a Professor Emeritus in the department of education at the University of Haifa.

Early life and education

Career 
He served as the Editor in Chief of the Educational Psychologist.

Awards and honours
 In 2001, he received the Israel Prize, for education
 He also received the Sylvia Scribner Award from the American Educational Research Association

See also
List of Israel Prize recipients

References

External links
 Biography
 Publications

Educational psychologists
Peace education
Israel Prize in education recipients
Academic staff of the University of Haifa
2016 deaths
1938 births
Stanford University alumni
Educational Psychologist (journal) editors